North America has numerous places named after biblical towns and places. While most of them are in the eastern United States, very few are in the west and in Canada.

North America List

United States extended list

Antioch
Antioch on the Orontes (Greek  Ἀντιόχεια ἡ ἐπὶ Ὀρόντου Antiocheia hē epi Orontou) was a city on the eastern side of the Orontes River. It was visited by Saint Peter and Saint Paul.
Antioch, Arkansas
Antioch, California
Antioch, Illinois
Antioch, Ohio
Antioch, Tennessee

Athens
Athens, Alabama
Athens, Arkansas
Athens, Georgia
Athens, Ohio
Athens, Tennessee
Athens, Pennsylvania

Bethabara
Bethabara (Aramaic בית עברה Bēth‛ăbhārāh) is a site where John the Baptist baptized.
Bethabara Historic District, North Carolina

Bethany
Bethany (Aramaic: בית עניא, Beth Anya, "house of the figs") was a village near Jerusalem and residence of the siblings Martha, Mary and Lazarus, and also Simon the Leper.
Bethany, Connecticut
Bethany Beach, Delaware
Bethany, Parke County, Indiana
Bethany, Nebraska
Bethany, Ohio
Bethany, Oklahoma
Bethany, Oregon
Bethany, Pennsylvania
Bethany, West Virginia

Bethel
Bethel (Hebrew: בֵית אֵל bet el, "House of God") was a border town between Benjamin and Ephraim.
Bethel, Alaska
Bethel Census Area, Alaska
Bethel, Arkansas (disambiguation)
Bethel, Connecticut
Bethel, Maine
Bethel, Minnesota
East Bethel, Minnesota
Bethel, Missouri
Bethel, Ohio
Bethel, Vermont
Bethel Heights, Arkansas
Bethel Island, California
Bethel Springs, Tennessee
Bethel Township, Lebanon County, Pennsylvania

Bethesda
The Pool of Bethesda (Aramaic בית חסדא Beth ḥesda "House of Mercy") is a healing pool in Jerusalem.
Bethesda, Maryland
Bethesda Fountain in New York's Central Park
Bethesda Orphanage of Savannah, Georgia

Bethlehem
Bethlehem (בֵית לֶחֶם Beit Lehem, Literally: "House of the bread'") was a town in the hill country of Judah and the birthplace of Jesus (according to Mark and Luke) and David, as well as the place of death of Rachel.
Bethlehem, Arkansas
Bethlehem, Connecticut
Bethlehem, Georgia
Bethlehem, New Hampshire
Bethlehem Township, New Jersey
Bethlehem, New York
Bethlehem, North Carolina
Bethlehem, Pennsylvania
Bethlehem, West Virginia

Bethpage
Bethpage or Bethphage (Aramaic בית פגי "House of unripe figs") is a town where Jesus asked the disciples to find a donkey and colt for his Entry into Jerusalem.
Bethpage, New York

Beulah
Buelah, Arkansas

Canaan
Canaan (Phoenician: Kanaʻn; Hebrew: כְּנָעַן Kənáʻan) was a region conquered by the Israelites as the Promised Land.
Canaan, Arkansas
Canaan, Connecticut
Canaan, New Hampshire
Canaan Valley, West Virginia

Carmel
Mount Carmel (Hebrew הַר הַכַּרְמֶל, Har HaKarmel, "God's vineyard") was a sacred mountain where Elijah defeated the prophets of a Ba'al in a contest. Carmel was a town in Judea mentioned as the residence of Nabal and Abigail.
Mount Carmel, Iowa
Carmel, Maine
Mount Carmel, Pennsylvania
Carmel, Indiana

Corinth
Corinth (Greek: Κόρινθος, Kórinthos) was a city on the Isthmus of Corinth. Paul of Tarsus lived there for 18 months, and also wrote two epistles to the Corinthians.
Corinth, Arkansas
Corinth (town), New York

Damascus
Damascus is a Syrian city. The Conversion of Paul the Apostle took place on the road to Damascus.
Damascus, Arkansas
Damascus, Georgia
Damascus, Maryland
Damascus, Ohio
Damascus, Township in, Pennsylvania

Emmaus
Emmaus (Greek: Ἐμμαούς, Emmaous; Hebrew: חמת Hammat, "warm spring") was a town near Jerusalem. Jesus appeared to two of the Apostles on the road between Jerusalem and Emmaus.
Emmaus, Pennsylvania

Ephesus
Ephesus (Greek: Ἔφεσος Ephesos) was a Greek city on the west coast of Anatolia. Paul of Tarsus lived there for several years, and also wrote an Epistle to the Ephesians. One of the Seven churches of Asia to whom the first part of the Book of Revelation is addressed. The author praises the Ephesians for their perseverance and discernment, but admonishes them for backsliding from a more praiseworthy condition.

Ephesus, Georgia

Gethsemane
Gethsemane, Arkansas

Goshen
The Land of Goshen (Hebrew גֹּשֶׁן Gōšen) was a place settled by the sons of Jacob.
Goshen, Arkansas
Goshen, Alabama
Goshen, Connecticut
Goshen, Indiana
Goshen, Kentucky
Goshen, Massachusetts
Goshen, Missouri
Goshen (town), New York
Goshen (village), New York
Goshen, Oregon
Goshen County, Wyoming
 Goshen Township, Hardin County, Ohio
 Goshen Township, Tuscarawas County, Ohio
Goshen Settlement, a historical area in Illinois

Hebron
Hebron (Hebrew חֶבְרוֹן Ḥeḇrôn, "friend") was a city in Canaan mentioned in several parts of the Old Testament.
Hebron, Arkansas
Hebron, Connecticut
Hebron, Indiana
Hebron, Maryland
Hebron, Nebraska
Hebron, New Hampshire
Hebron, New York
Hebron, North Dakota
Hebron, Pleasants County, West Virginia
Hebron, Ohio

Hell
Hell is mentioned 54 times in the King James Version of the bible, representing a place of torment and punishment in the afterlife. 
Half Hell, North Carolina
 Hell, Michigan

Jericho
Jericho (Hebrew יְרִיחוֹ Yəriḥo, "fragrant" or "Moon") was a city conquered in the battle of Jericho by Joshua and the Children of Israel.
Jericho, Arkansas
Jericho, New York
Jerico Springs, Missouri

Jerusalem
Jerusalem (Hebrew יְרוּשָׁלַיִם Yerushaláyim, "Abode of Peace" or "Abode of Shalim") was the traditional capital city of the Israelites and site of the Temple.

 Jerusalem, Arkansas
 Jerusalem, New York
 Jerusalem, Ohio
 Jerusalem, Virginia, now Courtland, Virginia

Jordan

The Jordan River (Hebrew: נהר הירדן Nehar Hayarden) forms the eastern border of Palestine and was the site of the baptism of Jesus.

Towns
Jordan, Arkansas
Jordan, Iowa
Jordan, Minnesota, a city in Scott County
West Jordan, Utah

Rivers
Ohio River, called the "River Jordan" by slaves escaping to freedom in the North before and during the American Civil War
Jordan River (Utah)

Judea 
Where most of the Bible stories took place in what is today Israel
Mt. Judea, Arkansas

Lebanon
Lebanon (Semitic root L-B-N, "white") is a land to the north of the current state of Israel (Biblically; Canaan) and is mentioned 70 times in the Bible.
Lebanon, Arkansas
Lebanon, Connecticut
Lebanon, Indiana
Lebanon, Kentucky
Lebanon, Maine
Lebanon, New Hampshire
Lebanon, New Jersey
Lebanon, Ohio
Lebanon, Pennsylvania
Lebanon, Tennessee

Mount Hermon
Mount Hermon (Hebrew הר חרמון Har Hermon) was the northern limit of the Promised Land and possible site of the Transfiguration.
 Mount Hermon, California

Moab

Moab (Hebrew: מוֹאָב Môʼāḇ, "seed of father") was a strip of land on the eastern shore of the Dead Sea. It was founded by a son of Lot.

Moab, Utah

Mount Olivet
The Mount of Olives or Mount Olivet (Hebrew: הַר הַזֵּיתִים Har HaZeitim) is a mountain east of Jerusalem, most notable as the site of the Olivet discourse and the Ascension of Jesus.

Mount Olive, Arkansas (disambiguation)
Mount Olivet Cemetery, many throughout the US

Mount Nebo
Mt. Nebo, Arkansas
Nebo, North Carolina

Nazareth

Nazareth (Hebrew נָצְרַת Natzrat / Natzeret) was a village in Galilee which was the childhood home of Jesus.
Nazareth, Pennsylvania
Nazareth, Texas

Nimrod
Nimrod, Arkansas
Nimrod, Minnesota
Nimrod, Oregon

Nineveh
Nineveh (Hebrew: נינוה Nīnewē) was an Assyrian city on the eastern bank of the Tigris. It is mentioned in several parts of the Bible.
Nineveh, New York

Ophir
Ophir (Hebrew אוֹפִיר ʼÔp̄îr) is mentioned in the Bible as a source of King Solomon's wealth.

Ophir, California
Ophir, Colorado
Ophir City, California

Palestine
Palestine is a narrow region along the Mediterranean Sea from Northern Sinai until Caesarea.
Palestine, Arkansas
Palestine, Illinois
Palestine, Texas
Palestine, Kosciusko County, Indiana
East Palestine, Ohio
Palestine, Wirt County, West Virginia

Patmos

Patmos (Greek: Πάτμος) was the residence of John of Patmos, author of the Book of Revelation.

Patmos, Arkansas

Rehoboth
Rehoboth (Hebrew רְחוֹבוֹת Reḥovot, "broad place") is the name of three places in the Bible. In , It signifies vacant land in the Land of Canaan where Isaac is permitted to dig a well without being ousted by the Philistines.

Rehoboth, Massachusetts
Rehoboth Beach, Delaware
Rehoboth, New Mexico
Rehoboth, Perry County, Ohio
Rehoboth, Seneca County, Ohio

Salem
Salem (sha'lem) [Cana'anite patron god; son of 'Ashtar] is a city mentioned in the biblical Old Testament. It was the
royal city of Melchizedek and traditionally identified with Jerusalem.

 Salem, Alabama
 Salem, Arkansas
 Salem, Fulton County, Arkansas
 Salem, Saline County, Arkansas
 Salem, Connecticut
 Salem, Florida
 Salem, Georgia
 Salem, Illinois
 Salem, Indiana
 Salem, Indiana in Washington County
 Salem, Adams County, Indiana
 Salem, Jay County, Indiana
 Salem, Iowa
 Salem, Kentucky
 Salem, Massachusetts
 Salem Harbor
 Salem Channel, a part of the Salem Sound
 Salem (MBTA station)
 Salem, Michigan, renamed Burnips
 Salem Township, Washtenaw County, Michigan
 Salem, Missouri
 Salem, Nebraska
 Salem, New Hampshire
 Salem, New Jersey
 Salem Nuclear Power Plant
 Salem River, a tributary of the Delaware River
 Salem, New Mexico
 Salem, New York
 Salem (town), New York
 Salem (village), New York
 Salem, an earlier name of Brocton, New York
 Salem, North Carolina
 Winston-Salem, North Carolina
 Old Salem, a history museum in Winston-Salem
 Salem, Ohio
 Salem, Oklahoma
 Salem, Oregon, the state capital
 Salem Metropolitan Statistical Area
 Salem (Amtrak station), a railroad station
 Salem, South Carolina
 Salem, South Dakota
 Salem, Texas, in Newton County
 Salem, Utah
 Salem, Virginia, an independent city adjacent to Roanoke
 Salem, Virginia Beach, Virginia, a neighborhood
 Salem, West Virginia
 Salem, Wisconsin
 Salem, Kenosha County, Wisconsin, a town in Kenosha County
 Salem (community), Kenosha County, Wisconsin, an unincorporated community in Kenosha County
 Salem, Pierce County, Wisconsin, a town in Pierce County
 Salem (community), Pierce County, Wisconsin, an unincorporated community in Pierce County
 Salem Oaks, Wisconsin, an unincorporated community in Kenosha County

Shiloh
Shiloh (Hebrew שילו Šîlô / שלו Šīlô / שלה Šīlōh) was an assembly place for the people of Israel where there was a sanctuary containing the Ark of the Covenant.
Shiloh, Arkansas (disambiguation)
Shiloh, Georgia
Shiloh, Indiana
Shiloh, Michigan, mostly abandoned
Shiloh, Richland County, Ohio
Shiloh, Hampshire County, West Virginia
Shiloh, York County, Pennsylvania

Siloam
Siloam Springs, Arkansas

Smyrna
One of the Seven churches of Asia to whom the first part of the Book of Revelation is addressed. The author praises their fortitude in adversity.
New Smyrna Beach, Florida
Smyrna, Arkansas (disambiguation)
Smyrna, California
Smyrna, Delaware
New Smyrna Beach, Florida
Smyrna, Georgia
Smyrna, Decatur County, Indiana
Smyrna, Jefferson County, Indiana
Smyrna, Louisville, Kentucky, a neighborhood
Smyrna, Maine
Smyrna, Michigan
Smyrna, Nebraska
Smyrna (town), New York
Smyrna (village), New York
Smyrna, North Carolina
Smyrna, South Carolina
Smyrna, Tennessee
Smyrna, Washington

Tyre

Tyre (Hebrew צור Ṣōr) is a city in the Lebanon mentioned many times in the Old Testament.

Tyre, New York

Mount Zion
Mount Zion (Hebrew הר צִיּוֹן Har Tsion) is an elevation west of the Mount of Olives outside Jerusalem and was used as a name for the Temple Mount or the City of David.
Zion, Arkansas
 Zion, Illinois
 Zion National Park

See also
List of Mormon place names

References

Place Names
Canada geography-related lists
Toponymy
Lists of place names
Names of places in the Americas
North America-related lists
Biblical
Lists of United States placename etymology
Biblical places
Bible in popular culture